Alan Anthony Price (16 August 1928 – 30 May 2019) was an author of espionage thrillers. Price was born in Rickmansworth, Hertfordshire, England. He attended The King's School, Canterbury and served in the British Army from 1947 to 1949, reaching the rank of captain. He read history at Merton College, Oxford, from 1949 to 1952, and was awarded an MA in 1956. Price was a journalist with the Westminster Press from 1952 to 1988, as well as the editor of the Oxford Times from 1972 to 1988. He was the author of nineteen novels in the Dr David Audley/Colonel Jack Butler series. These books focus on a group of counter-intelligence agents who work for an organization loosely based on the real MI5.

Price died in Blackheath, London from chronic obstructive pulmonary disease on 30 May 2019, at the age of 90.

Bibliography

Novels
The Labyrinth Makers (1970) UK; (1971) US; winner of Silver Dagger Award.
The Alamut Ambush (1971) UK; (1972) US
Colonel Butler's Wolf (1972) UK; (1973) US
October Men (1973) UK; (1974) US
Other Paths to Glory (1974) UK; (1975) US; winner of Gold Dagger Award, and shortlisted for the Dagger of Daggers, a special award given in 2005 by the Crime Writers' Association(CWA) to celebrate its 50th anniversary. 
Our Man in Camelot (1975) UK; (1976) US
War Game (1976) UK; (1977) US
The '44 Vintage (1978) UK & US
Tomorrow's Ghost (1979) UK & US
The Hour of the Donkey (1980) UK & US
Soldier No More (1981) UK; (1981) US
The Old Vengeful (1982) UK; (1983) US
Gunner Kelly (1983) UK; (1984) US
Sion Crossing (1984) UK & US
Here Be Monsters (1985) UK & US
For the Good of the State (1986) UK; (1987) US
A New Kind of War (1987) UK; (1988) US
A Prospect of Vengeance (1988) UK; (1990) US
The Memory Trap (1989)

Short stories
 A Green Boy – first published in Winter's Crimes 5 (1973)
 The Boudicca Killing – first published in Winter's Crimes 11 (1979)
 The Berzin Lecture – first published in Winter's Crimes 15 (1983)
 The Chinaman's Garden – first published in John Creasey's Crime Collection 1984 (1984)
 The Road to Suez – first published in The Rigby File (1989), ed. Tim Heald

Non-fiction
The Eyes of the Fleet: A Popular History of Frigates and Frigate Captains 1793–1815 (1990)

References

External links
 
Addenda to CRIME FICTION IV: Anthony Price, Otto Penzler & others.
Review of the Audley series by Jo Walton
Anthony Price interview Part I
Anthony Price interview Part II

1928 births
2019 deaths
People from Hertfordshire
British thriller writers
British spy fiction writers
People educated at The King's School, Canterbury
Alumni of Merton College, Oxford
Members of the Detection Club
Royal Army Educational Corps officers
Military personnel from Hertfordshire
20th-century British Army personnel
Respiratory disease deaths in England
Deaths from chronic obstructive pulmonary disease